Marie in the garden is a 1895 painting by artist Peder Severin Krøyer. The painting depicts Krøyer's wife Marie Krøyer in the couple's garden in Skagen. The work measures 58.2 x 47.9 cm.

The work was sold at auction in 2000 at the Christie's auction house in London where it sold for £729,750. At the time of the sale this made the painting the second most expensive Danish work of art. The work is today in private ownership.

References

1895 paintings
Paintings by Peder Severin Krøyer